Elections to the Garo Hills Autonomous District Council (GHADC) were held on 12 October 2021. The NPP emerged as the largest party with 10 seats after the counting of the election results.

Party Candidates

Results

By Party

By Constituency

References

2015 elections in India
Elections in Meghalaya
Autonomous district council elections in India